Cine Monumental may refer to several cinemas:

Cine Monumental (Buenos Aires), in Buenos Aires, Argentina
Cine Monumental (Rosario), in Rosario, Santa Fe

See also

 Monumental (disambiguation)